Kaw Township may refer to the following townships in the United States:

 Kaw Township, Jefferson County, Kansas
 Kaw Township, Jackson County, Missouri